The Recruiting Act 1703 (2 & 3 Ann. c.13) was an Act of the Parliament of England, after the start of the War of the Spanish Succession in Europe, with Queen Anne's War in America. It was long titled  An Act for raising Recruits for the Land Forces, and Marines, and for dispensing with Part of the Act for the Encouragement and Increase of Shipping and Navigation, during the present War. With the pressures of war, the act provided for the forcible enlistment of able bodied men into the army and navy who did not have visible means of subsistence. It also established administration and regulations under the act within local jurisdictions and became effective for one year from 1 March 1703.

Section eight of the act relaxed the normal crewing requirements for merchant ships under the Navigation Acts, which mandates that three quarters of the crew be English subjects. This act allowed up to half the crew to be foreigners during the war. It was intended to make experienced English seamen more available to serve on ships of war.

The act was repealed by the Statute Law Revision Act 1867.

References

External links
 Recruiting Act 1703, text
 
 

Acts of the Parliament of England
1703 in law
1703 in England
1703 in military history
Military history of England